Callidula aureola is a moth in the family Callidulidae first described by Charles Swinhoe in 1905. It is found on Obi in Indonesia.

References

Callidulidae
Moths described in 1905